Singapore competed at the 1960 Summer Olympics in Rome, Italy. Five competitors, all men, took part in three events in three sports. This marked the first and only time Singapore competed at the Olympics as a self-governing colony of the United Kingdom under what would later become the national flag. Tan Howe Liang won the territory's first ever Olympic medal, its only medal until 2008.

Medalists

Silver
Tan Howe Liang — weightlifting, men's lightweight

The following Singaporean athletes participated in the games:

Sailing

James Cooke
Durcan Thomas Kevin
Holiday Edward Gilbert

Shooting

One shooter represented Singapore in 1960.

50 m pistol
 Kok Kum Woh

Weightlifting

Tan Howe Liang (2nd place)

References

External links
Official Olympic Reports
International Olympic Committee results database

Nations at the 1960 Summer Olympics
1960
1960 in Singaporean sport